Turchia may be: 
the Italian name of Turkey
the Khazar Empire
the Seljuk Empire
the Ottoman Empire

See also
Name of Turkey
Tartary